Uffington is a civil parish in Shropshire, England.  In the parish are 13 listed buildings that are recorded in the National Heritage List for England.  Of these, one is listed at Grade I, the highest of the three grades, and the others are at Grade II, the lowest grade.  The parish contains the village of Uffington, and is otherwise mainly rural. In the parish are the remains of Haughmond Abbey, which is listed at Grade I, and is also a Scheduled Monument.  Also in the parish was Sundorne Castle, a country house that has been demolished.  A number of structures associated with the house have survived, and are listed.  The other listed buildings include houses, cottages, farmhouses and farm buildings, the earliest of which are timber framed, a pump in an enclosure, and a church.


Key

Buildings

References

Citations

Sources

Lists of buildings and structures in Shropshire